Inayat Khan Rehmat Khan (5 July 1882 – 5 February 1927) was an Indian professor of musicology, singer, exponent of the saraswati vina, poet, philosopher, and pioneer of the transmission of Sufism to the West. At the urging of his students, and on the basis of his ancestral Sufi tradition and four-fold training and authorization at the hands of Sayyid Abu Hashim Madani (d. 1907) of Hyderabad, he established an order of Sufism (the Sufi Order) in London in 1914. By the time of his death in 1927, centers had been established throughout Europe and North America, and multiple volumes of his teachings had been published.

Early life
Inayat Khan was born in Baroda to a noble Mughal family. His paternal ancestors, comprising yüzkhans (Mughal lords) and bakshys (shamans) , were Turkmen from the Chagatai Khanate who settled in Sialkot, Punjab during the reign of Amir Timur. Inayat Khan's maternal grandfather, Sangit Ratna Maulabakhsh Sholay Khan, was a Hindustani classical musician and educator known as “the Beethoven of India.” His maternal grandmother, Qasim Bibi, was from the royal house of Tipu Sultan of Mysore.

Sufism
Inayat Khan's Sufi sources included both the traditions of his paternal ancestors (remembered as the Mahashaikhan) and the tutelage he received from Sayyid Abu Hashim Madani. From the latter he inherited four transmissions, constituting succession in the Chishti, Suhrawardi, Qadiri, and Naqshbandi orders of Sufism. Of these, the Chishti lineage, traced through the Delhi-based legacy of Shah Kalim Allah Jahanabadi, was primary.

Travels
Inayat Khan toured the United States with his brother Maheboob Khan and cousin Mohammed Ali Khan between the years 1910 and 1912. Further travels took him to England, France, and Russia. During the First World War, living in London, he oversaw the founding of an order of Sufism under his guidance. Following the war he traveled widely, and numerous Sufi centers sprang up in his wake in Europe and the U.S. He ultimately settled in Suresnes, France, at the house and khanqah (Sufi lodge) known as Fazal Manzil.

Teaching
Inayat Khan's teaching emphasized the oneness of God (tawhid) and the underlying harmony of the revelations communicated by the prophets of all the world's great religions. His discourses treated such varied subjects as religion, art, music, ethics, philosophy, psychology, and health and healing. The primary concern of Inayat Khan's teaching was the mystical pursuit of God-realization. To this end he established an Inner School comprising four stages of contemplative study based on the traditional Sufi disciplines of mujahada, muraqaba, mushahada, and mu‘ayyana, which he rendered in English as concentration, contemplation, meditation, and realization.

Foundational principles
Ten principles, known as the Ten Sufi Thoughts, enunciate the universal spiritual values that are foundational to Inayat Khan's mystical philosophy.

 There is One God, the Eternal, the Only Being; none exists save God.
 There is One Master, the Guiding Spirit of all Souls, Who constantly leads followers towards the light.
 There is One Holy Book, the sacred manuscript of nature, the only scripture which can enlighten the reader.
 There is One Religion, the unswerving progress in the right direction towards the ideal, which fulfills the life's purpose of every soul.
 There is One Law, the law of reciprocity, which can be observed by a selfless conscience together with a sense of awakened justice.
 There is One Brotherhood and Sisterhood, the human brotherhood and sisterhood, which unites the children of earth indiscriminately in the Parenthood of God.
 There is One Moral, the love which springs forth from self-denial, and blooms in deeds of beneficence.
 There is One Object of Praise, the beauty which uplifts the heart of its worshippers through all aspects from the seen to the unseen.
 There is One Truth, the true knowledge of our being, within and without, which is the essence of all wisdom.
 There is One Path, the annihilation of the false ego in the real, which raises the mortal to immortality, and in which resides all perfection.

Family and personal life
In New York, he met the woman who would become his wife, Ora Ray Baker (henceforth known as Ameena Begum). They had four children: Vilayat Inayat Khan, Hidayat Inayat Khan, Noor Inayat Khan, and Khair-un-Nisa Inayat Khan.

Death and legacy

In 1926 he returned to India; he died in Delhi on 5 February 1927.

Bibliography

Musicological works
Balasan Gitmala
Sayaji Garbawali
Inayat Git Ratnawali
Inayat Harmonium Shikshak
Inayat Fidal Shikshak
Minqar-i Musiqar

Sufi works
1914	A Sufi Message of Spiritual Liberty
1915	The Confessions of Inayat Khan
1918	A Sufi Prayer of Invocation
Hindustani Lyrics
Songs of India
The Divan of Inayat Khan
Akibat
1919	Love, Human and Divine
The Phenomenon of the Soul
Pearls from the Ocean Unseen
1921	In an Eastern Rosegarden
1922 	The Way of Illumination
The Message
1923 	The Inner Life
The Mysticism of Sound
Notes from the Unstruck Music from the Gayan Manuscript
The Alchemy of Happiness
1924 	The Soul—Whence and Whither
1926 	The Divine Symphony, or Vadan

Posthumous Sufi works
1927 	Nirtan, or The Dance of the Soul
The Purpose of Life
1928 	The Unity of Religious Ideals
1931 	Health
Character Building; The Art of Personality
1934 	Education
1935 	The Mind World
Yesterday, Today, and Tomorrow
1936  The Bowl of Saki
The Solution of the Problem of the Day
1937 	Cosmic Language
Moral Culture
1938 	Rassa Shastra: The Science of Life's Creative Forces
1939 	Three Plays
Metaphysics: The Experience of the Soul in Different Planes of Existence
1980   Nature Meditations

Collected works
1960–1967 The Sufi Message of Hazrat Inayat Khan, 12 volumes
1988–	Complete Works of Pir-o-Murshid Hazrat Inayat Khan: Original Texts, 12 volumes (to date)
2016–	The Sufi Message of Hazrat Inayat Khan: Centennial Edition, 4 volumes (to date)

See also

Inayati Order
Vilayat Inayat Khan (son)
Western Sufism
Zia Inayat Khan (grandson, current president of the Inayati Order)

References

External links
 
 
 
 Hazrat Inayat Khan: A Sufi maestro in Moscow.

1882 births
1927 deaths
Chishtis
Indian Sufis
Gujarati people
Indian people of Turkic descent
Founders of new religious movements
Sufi mystics
Sufi psychology
Universalists
Ināyati Sufis
Indian music
People from Vadodara
Indian emigrants to France